Bharathi Tirtha Mahaswamiji (alternative spellings: Bharati, Teertha), (Purvashrama name Seetharama Anjaneyalu) (born 11 April 1951), is an Indian religious leader who is the current and 36th Shankaracharya of Sringeri Sharada Peetham, an important Hindu monastery in the tradition of Advaita Vedanta established by Sri Adi Shankara.

Early life and career 

Bharathi Tirtha was born 11 April 1951 to a Telugu Smarta family from Machilipatnam. His family later moved to Narasaraopet, Andhra Pradesh.

He was a religiously-minded child. His upanayana ceremony was performed when he was seven years of age. In addition to schooling, he spent his time studying Sanskrit and took lessons in the Vedas from his father who himself was a Vedic scholar.

In the year 1966, at the age of 15, Anjaneyalu approached the 35th Jagadguru of the Sringeri Sharada Peetham, Abhinava Vidyatirtha, seeking religious guidance from him. Vidyatirtha accepted Anjaneyalu as the disciple.

Abhinava Vidyatirtha appointed Seetharama Anjaneyalu as the successor-designate on the 11 November 1974, when Anjaneyalu received saffron robes, a staff, and a kamandalu (water pot). The newly initiated sannyasi was given the title of Yogapatta Bharathi Tirtha in line with the Dashanami Sampradaya of Adi Shankaracharya.

As part of the tradition, Bharati Tirtha undertakes tours to different places in order to offer guidance to the devotees. The most recent tour took place in 2017 and spanned Tamil Nadu, Kerala and Karnataka.

References

External links
Sringeri Sharada Peetham
About Shri Adi Sankarcharya and His Parampara

Advaita Vedanta
Sringeri Sharada Peetham
1951 births
Living people
Indian Hindu monks
Shankaracharyas
Telugu people
People from Guntur district
People from Andhra Pradesh